The International Journal of Neuropsychopharmacology is a peer-reviewed scientific journal published by Oxford University Press. It is an official journal of the Collegium Internationale Neuro-Psychopharmacologicum (CINP) (International College of Neuro-Psychopharmacology) and covers basic and clinical topics in neuropharmacology and psychopharmacology. It was established in 1998 by Bernard Lerer, who served as editor-in-chief until 2008.

References

External links 
 
 Collegium Internationale Neuro-Psychopharmacologicum

Publications established in 1998
Oxford University Press academic journals
English-language journals
Pharmacology journals